Balthasar Moncornet  (b.1600 Rouen, France d.1668 Paris, France) was a French painter, engraver, and tapissier that was revered for his depictions of around 45 different prominent figures of the 17th century.

Gallery of selected portraits

Other Works 

 Le livre de toutes sortes de feuilles pour servir à l'art d'orfebvrerie (Paris, 1634.)

- The book of all kinds of leaves for use in goldsmith's art (Paris, 1634.)

 Livre nouveau de toutes sort of d'ouvrages d'orfevries. Paris, Jean Moncornet (c. 1670.)

- New book of all sorts of works of goldsmiths. Paris, Jean Moncornet (C. 1670.)

 A Newes booklet by allhant Goldschimerrey picked up from all the best workers of this time (London, Bernard Quaritch, 1888, 12 engravings.)
 Actual demolition of the place occupied earlier, and in place of Churpfaltz, place and fortress Mannheimb: as the same day in the beginning of the month Octobris Anno besieged in 1622 by Count von Tilli
 Actual depiction of the Electoral Principal of Heydelberg: How it was conquered by Lord Count von Thilli, (conquered by Her Duke Ferdinand Hertzog in Bayrn, supreme lieutenant), conquered by force...
Plan de la ville de Rome, comme elle est apresent soubs regne du pape Clement IX, 1668

-(Map) Plan of the city of Rome, as it is now under the reign of Pope Clement IX, 1668

References

External links

 
Wikimedia Commons images 

1668 deaths
16th-century births
17th-century French engravers
17th-century publishers (people)
French printers
Artists from Rouen